The following are lists of current National Hockey League (NHL) team rosters:

For Eastern Conference rosters please see List of current NHL Eastern Conference team rosters.
For Western Conference rosters please see List of current NHL Western Conference team rosters.

 Team Rosters
 Team Rosters
Lists of sports lists
National Hockey League